The City Academy Bristol is a mixed gender secondary school with Academy status, located in the Easton area of Bristol, England.

History
The school opened in September 2003. It formed part of the Labour government's scheme for schools in deprived areas, and was the first Academy in South West England.

Built on the site of St George Community College which closed in 2003, it is housed in buildings within a new £25 million complex designed by architects Fielden Clegg Bradley. The school also provides adult education to about 1,200 people.

Both the University of the West of England and Bristol City Football Club are partners with the school and helped fund the school's buildings and equipment.

The school operates a house system for pupils, with four houses: Leopards, Lions, Panthers and Tigers. The school is designated as a specialist Sports College, and runs a Performance Sport programme for netball, basketball, football, boxing and cricket.

In October 2013 One World Learning Trust, the academy's operator, was issued with a "pre-warning notice letter" by the Department for Education because the academic performance of the academy was unacceptably low.

In 2014 the school lost a racial discrimination employment tribunal case for repeatedly overlooking a black employee for promotion. Investigation showed that other black staff had been overlooked when appointing three white managers. The academy said "We are deeply sorry and extending our sense of sorrow to those involved".

During 2014 the school had two incidents of losing or failing to submit coursework required for external exams, causing pupils to have to retake a year of their education.
In March 2015 the school announced a partnership with the Cabot Learning Federation, a major operator of Academies in Bristol, after Ofsted had issued an inadequate rating in an inspection report in January 2015, and the school was placed into special measures status.

In 2016 the Cabot Learning Federation, a multi-academy trust, took over as the operator of the school. The school remained in special measures.

Following an inspection in April 2019, the school is now rated as 'Good' in all areas, with Ofsted noting that "strong leadership" had "led to rapid improvement over the past three years".

Academic achievement
The table below shows the percentage of students hitting the key measure of 5+ A*-C GCSEs including English and Mathematics.

References

External links

The City Academy Bristol - Performance Sport
The City Academy Bristol - Sports Centre

Academies in Bristol
Sports venues in Bristol
Secondary schools in Bristol
Educational institutions established in 2003
2003 establishments in England